William Marshal (died 24 June 1314), Lord of Hingham, was an English noble. He was hereditary Earl Marshal of Ireland and was slain during the Battle of Bannockburn, Scotland in 1314.

William was a son of John Marshal and Hawise de Say. He was killed fighting the Scots during the Battle of Bannockburn on 24 June 1314.

Marriage and issue
He married Christian, daughter of Robert FitzWalter and Devorguille de Burgh, they are known to have had the following known issue: 
John Marshal (died 1316), married Ela Lovel, without issue.
Hawise Marshal, married Robert de Morley, had issue.
Ellen Marshal, married Robert de Mautby, had issue.

Citations

References

Year of birth unknown
1314 deaths
13th-century English people
14th-century English people